Checkers, or draughts, is a board game.

Checkers or chequers may also refer to:

Arts, entertainment, and media
 Checkers (1913 film), a 1913 lost American silent film with Gertrude Shipman
 Checkers (1919 film), a 1919 lost American melodrama silent film
 Checkers (1937 film), a 1937 American drama film
 Checkers (novel), a young-adult fiction novel by Australian author John Marsden
 The Checkers (American band), a doo-wop group of the 1950s
 The Checkers (Japanese band), a Japanese idol group of the 1980s

Brands and enterprises
 Checkers (fast food), an American fast food restaurant chain
 Checkers (supermarket chain), a supermarket chain in South Africa
 Checkers Food Stores, a Channel Islands supermarket chain

Ice hockey teams
 Charlotte Checkers, American Hockey League team
 Columbus Checkers, a former team
 Indianapolis Checkers, a defunct team
 Oakland Checkers, part of the California Hockey League from 1930 to 1933

Other uses
 Checkers speech, made by Richard Nixon in 1952, mentioning his dog named Checkers
 Chequers, the country residence of the Prime Minister of the United Kingdom
 Chequers plan, the informal name for the future relationship between the United Kingdom and the European Union
 Sorbus torminalis or Checkers tree, a tree species

See also

 Charlotte Checkers (disambiguation)
 Check (disambiguation), including cheque
 Checker (disambiguation), including chequer
 Draft (disambiguation), including draught